New Vintage: The Best of Simon May is a 1994 compilation album featuring some of the key works from British film and television music composer Simon May.

The album was accompanied by a UK tour, named "A Night Away From the TV". May used several school choirs for the show including Wareham Middle School, which also included performers Kate Robbins and 1990 Opportunity Knocks winner Mark Rattray.
Some performances had to be cancelled because of low ticket sales.

A BBC television Pebble Mill special was broadcast on BBC1 on 20 December 1994. It featured aspects of the planning, rehearsals and performances of the tour, including comments by Cliff Richard about the failure of some projects. May discussed the writing process, especially for the theme to Jobs for the Girls. It included interviews with Tony Holland, Gerard Glaister and Verity Lambert, who discussed his work for EastEnders, Howards' Way and Eldorado respectively.

Track listing
Orchestral tracks are performed by the Simon May Orchestra.

See also
 The Simon May Collection — a 2010 compilation album.

References

External links
Music From the Movies - information
Track listing
BBC Essex - with biographical information about May and details about the chart performances of some titles on this album.

1994 compilation albums